is a Japanese publishing company. It is headquartered in Chiyoda, Tokyo.

The company mainly publishes manga magazines and is involved in series' productions in their games, original video animation, music, and their animated TV series.

The company is owned by Shueisha; thus, it is also partly owned by Shogakukan.

History
Hakusensha was founded on December 1, 1973, by Shueisha. It is now a separate company although still a part of the Hitotsubashi Group with Shueisha and Shogakukan as one of the major members of the keiretsu.

After setting up the company for five months, the firm published their first magazine, a shōjo manga magazine titled .

In 1975, the firm changed the frequency of their magazine from monthly to semi-monthly; in March, they created their first imprint, . In July 1976, they published their second manga magazine, a shōjo manga magazine named  as a sister magazine to Hana to Yume that is published bi-monthly. In April 1977, they set up a publication editing department and in July, they began publishing a seasonal magazine titled .

In September, they branched out from their usual shōjo manga magazines to a shōnen genre by publishing . With that, the company released their series in Shōnen Jets under a new imprint,  in July 1982. As of January 2009, the magazine was defunct but the imprint is used to publish their seinen manga series serializing in Young Animal and Young Animal Arashi as well as certain series serializing in Melody.

Three years later on August, they published a new magazine, specialising under the josei genre, Silky that is published on even-numbered months. With that, they created an imprint for Silkys series to be published under . In March 1989, they started publishing a seinen manga magazine called Animal House. Three years after Animal House, they published Moe, a monthly magazine for picture books targeted toward shōjo readers. In May that year, Animal House was renamed to Young Animal and was then published semi-monthly since.

In March 1994, they created another imprint, . This imprint is for publishing manga in the bunkoban format. Moreover, in December 1995, they started publishing another magazine that was published seasonally,  which is targeted toward josei readers.

In July that year, they created . In September, they published Melody which publishes on odd-numbered months.

In April 1996, they published LaLa DX on odd-numbered months. The company also began selling their drama CDs under , abbreviated as HCD.

In June 2001, they published Candy; as of January 2009, the magazine has been discontinued. In May 2005, they changed their special publication of Young Animal Arashi into a monthly publication. In July 2006, Bessatsu Hana to Yume was made a monthly publication. , a magazine targeted at readers of yaoi genre started its publication in May 2008.

Le Paradis, a manga anthology published triannually published its first issue on October 29, 2008.

Source:

Media mix

Moreover, they are involved in the productions of games, TV drama, theatrical movies, musicals, radio shows, TV animation and original video animation.

Hakusensha e-Comics was started in September 2005 and is operated by Hakusensha and CharaWeb. This service is available in two variations and customers will have to pay 315 yen and 512 yen respectively to access this service every month.

Source:

Sony PlayStation Portable manga distribution service
It was announced at the 2009 Tokyo Game Show press conference that Hakusensha and 11 other publishing companies in Japan (such as Kodansha, Shueisha, Shogakukan, Square Enix, publishers associated with Kadokawa Shoten, Bandai Visual and Futabasha) would provide nearly 100 titles of manga to supply the service in PlayStation Store. Hakusensha has yet to provide details of the supplied titles for the service.

This service is only available for Japanese PlayStation Portable consoles and will start in December 2009.

Publications

Manga magazines
Hana to Yume
Bessatsu Hana to Yume (defunct)
The Hana to Yume
LaLa
LaLa DX
Shōnen Jets (defunct)
Melody
Silky
Young Animal
Young Animal Zero
Young Animal Arashi (defunct)
Young Animal Island
HanaMaru Black
Le Paradis
Source:

Other publications
Shōsetsu HanaMaru
Moe
Kodomo Moe

Source:

Imprints
Hakusensha publishes their books and manga under these imprints.

Hana to Yume Comics
Young Animal Comics (formerly known as Jets Comics until June 2016)
Hakusensha Ladies Comics
HanaMaru Comics
Hakusensha Bunko
HanaMaru Bunko
HanaMaru Novels
HanaMaru Black

Awards
Hakusensha organizes contests to offer aspiring manga artist a professional debut as well to be affiliated with their magazines.

Radio show
There was a radio show hosted by voice actor Takehito Koyasu and Atsushi Kisaichi called  that was broadcast by Nippon Cultural Broadcasting. The show ended in March 2002. It was compiled into two CDs and is sold under Hakusensha's drama CD imprint, Hakusensha CD Collection (HCD).

See also

List of manga published by Hakusensha

References

External links

Official Website 
Corporate Website 
Official Twitter of Hakusensha 

 
Hitotsubashi Group
Book publishing companies in Tokyo
Comic book publishing companies in Tokyo
Magazine publishing companies in Tokyo
Distribution companies based in Tokyo
Manga distributors
Publishing companies established in 1973
1973 establishments in Japan
Anime companies